Robat Castle is a historical castle located in Abarkuh County in Yazd Province, The longevity of this fortress dates back to the Safavid dynasty.

References 

Castles in Iran